Guivarc'h or Guivarch is a surname, and may refer to;

Guivarc'h derives from uuiu (cf. gwiw) which means worthy in Old Breton and marc'h (cf. marc'h) which means horse in Breton.

 Stéphane Guivarc'h - French footballer
 Théo Guivarch - French footballer

See also
Guiomar
Guimard (disambiguation)
Wymer

References

External links
Distribution of the surname Guivarch in France

Breton-language surnames